Lillie Rec (proper name Lillie Road Recreational Ground), is a park located in London Borough of Hammersmith and Fulham, 0.8 mile (1.25 km) south of Hammersmith tube station, and at the junction of Lillie Road and Fulham Palace Road.

Sports events
Lille Rec regularly holds amateur football matches, and longer ago hosted Fulham FC.
The amateur football league is a big success in the Hammersmith and Fulham borough. It is a mixed league.

References

External links
 Lillie Road Recreation Ground London Gardens Online

History of the London Borough of Hammersmith and Fulham
Parks and open spaces in the London Borough of Hammersmith and Fulham
Fulham F.C. home grounds
Fulham